Thomas Lee Smith (born December 5, 1970) is a former American football defensive back in the National Football League (NFL) who played for the Buffalo Bills, the Chicago Bears, and the Indianapolis Colts.  He played college football at the University of North Carolina.

After being drafted 28th overall in the first round of the 1993 NFL Draft, Smith played primarily on special teams during the 1993 season.  He played in Super Bowl XXVIII for the Bills against the Dallas Cowboys.  He became a starting cornerback for Buffalo in 1994, a position he would hold through the 1999 season.  During this time, Smith became known as one of the top coverage cornerbacks in the NFL, but did not receive the Pro Bowl and/or All-Pro recognition his play deserved because of a lack of interceptions (at the time, advanced coverage statistics which would have benefited superb lockdown players like Smith did not exist, and his lack of interceptions was wrongly cited when he was seen as a good rather than great player).  He left Buffalo following 1999 to sign with the Chicago Bears, where he played in 2000.  He finished his playing career with the Indianapolis Colts in 2001.

External links
NFL.com player page

1970 births
Living people
People from Gatesville, North Carolina
American football cornerbacks
Players of American football from North Carolina
North Carolina Tar Heels football players
Buffalo Bills players
Chicago Bears players
Indianapolis Colts players